Below is the list of the winners at the German Open in badminton in Women's singles.

References
German Open Champions

German Open (badminton)